Gavin Smith (born 15 September 1977) is an Irish racing driver. His younger brother, Árón Smith, is also a racing driver who races in the British GT Championship, and formerly the British Touring Car Championship.

Career
Born in Dublin, Smith won Ireland's Fiat Punto championship in 1998, winning 12 times, before trying single-seaters for the next year. In 2000 he was in British Formula Renault, before moving up to the Scholarship class (using year old cars) of Formula 3.

However, it has been in touring cars that Gavin has raced since 2003. He had 2 seasons in the SEAT Cupra Championship, winning 4 races and coming 5th overall in 2004. By this time he had already made his BTCC debut in a one-off at Mondello Park, and he tested a VX Racing Vauxhall Astra in early 2005. After impressing the team he earned a drive in their third car, which the team openly admitted is awarded to the best driver who can bring enough money to fund it themselves, rather than necessarily the best available driver.

Gavin was 10th overall in 2005, although the fact that he was retained for 2006, while Colin Turkington was fired after finishing 6th, tells its own story. However, he did show signs of improvement late in the season: up until round 9 his best qualifyings were a pair of 4ths, and his best race result was a 5th place, whereas in the last 2 meetings he scored a 2nd and a 3rd, as well as qualifying 2nd in the last round.

In 2006, Smith improved to 8th overall, but lost his drive for 2007 when VX Racing downsized to a two-car team due to the pressures of preparing new-specification Vauxhall Vectras. With 3 rounds of the 2007 season to go, it was announced that Smith would join GR Asia in alongside Adam Jones, driving a 2007 spec SEAT León. He finished 13th Overall.

His younger brother, Árón, is also a racing driver and made his BTCC début in 2011 for the Triple Eight team, which previously competed under the VX Racing name. Árón races for Redstone Racing in 2012.

Racing record

Complete British Touring Car Championship results
(key) (Races in bold indicate pole position – 1 point awarded in first race) (Races in italics indicate fastest lap – 1 point awarded all races) (* signifies that driver lead race for at least one lap – 1 point awarded all races)

References

External links
 
 btcc:action profile

1977 births
British Touring Car Championship drivers
Irish racing drivers
Living people
Sportspeople from County Dublin
British Formula Three Championship drivers
Team Meritus drivers